Perdana University (PU), is an emerging private university located in  Kuala Lumpur, Malaysia focusing on health science and data science programmes at foundation (pre-university), undergraduate and postgraduate levels. Perdana University was officially incorporated in 2011. In 2017, Perdana University was awarded Tier 4: Very Good in the Rating System for Malaysian Higher Education 2017 (SETARA) from the Ministry of Higher Education Malaysia (MOHE).

The University took in its very first students in 2011 with the opening of the PU-RCSI School of Medicine and Graduate School of Medicine.
At present, the University consists of 6 Schools and 2 Centres. The School of Business is the latest school formed recently.

The main campus of PU located in MAEPS, Serdang, Selangor has been relocated to Wisma Chase Perdana, Damansara Heights, Kuala Lumpur in 2020 when MAEPS was used a COVID-19 pandemic hospital.

Ownership
Perdana University is a wholly owned subsidiary of Academic Medical Centre Sdn Bhd (AMC).

History 
The opening of Perdana University and the medical programme was officiated by the former Prime Minister of Malaysia, Dato' Seri Najib Razak while the former Prime Minister of Malaysia, Tun Dr. Mahathir Mohamad was appointed as its Founding Chancellor. Dato' Pahlawan Dr. R. Mohana Dass served as the founding Vice-Chancellor and Chief Executive of the Perdana University.

The University previously operated from an interim campus in the Malaysia Agro Exposition Park Serdang (MAEPS). The University has since then been relocated to Wisma Chase Perdana, Damansara Heights in 2020.

Schools & Centres

Schools
School of Liberal Arts, Science and Technology
School of Data Sciences
Graduate School of Medicine 
School of Occupational Therapy
PU-RCSI School of Medicine
School of Business

Centres
Centre for Research Excellence
Centre for Psychological Medicine

Partner institutions

 Brazil
Federal University of Pernambuco

 Brunei
Universiti Teknologi Brunei

 India
Manipal Academy of Higher Education
Swami Rama Himalayan University
Hans Raj Mahila Maha Vidyalaya
Institute of Bioinformatics, Bangalore
Birla Institute of Scientific Research

 Indonesia
Universitas Islam Indonesia
Universitas Yarsi
Indonesia International Institute for Life Sciences
Universitas Muhammadiyah Gorontalo

 Ireland
National University of Ireland
Royal College of Surgeons in Ireland

 Malaysia
Universiti Putra Malaysia
Kolej Universiti Islam Melaka

 Switzerland
International Business Academy of Switzerland

France

Alzette University 

 Thailand
Chiang Mai University, Faculty of Associated Medical Sciences

 Turkey
Bezmialem Vakif University

 United Kingdom
Anglia Ruskin University

 United States
University of California San Diego

See also

Perdana University-Royal College of Surgeons in Ireland School of Medicine

References

External links 
 

Universities and colleges in Kuala Lumpur
Educational institutions established in 2011
Private universities and colleges in Malaysia
Medical schools in Malaysia
2011 establishments in Malaysia